The 2012 Yukon/NWT Men's Curling Championship was held February 9–12 at the Whitehorse Curling Club in Whitehorse, Yukon.  The winning team of Jamie Koe,  will represent Yukon/Northwest Territories at the 2012 Tim Hortons Brier in Saskatoon, Saskatchewan.

Teams

Standings

Results

Draw 1
February 9, 3:00 PM

Draw 2
February 10, 10:00 AM

Draw 3
February 10, 3:00 PM

Draw 4
February 11, 1:00 PM

Draw 5
February 11, 7:00 PM

Draw 6
February 12, 8:30 AM

References

Curling in Yukon
Yukon NWT Men's Curling Championship
Yukon NWT Men's Curling Championship
Men's Curling Championship